Michael Elmhirst Cates  (born 5 May 1961) is a British physicist. He is the 19th Lucasian Professor of Mathematics at the University of Cambridge and has held this position since 1 July 2015.
He was previously Professor of Natural Philosophy at the University of Edinburgh, and has held a Royal Society Research Professorship since 2007.

His work focuses on the theory of soft matter, such as polymers, colloids, gels, liquid crystals, and granular material. A recurring goal of his research is to create a mathematical model that predicts the stress in a flowing material as a functional of the flow history of that material. Such a mathematical model is called a constitutive equation. He has worked on theories of active matter, particularly dense suspensions of self-propelled particles which can include motile bacteria. His interests also include fundamental field theories of active systems in which time-reversal symmetry (T-symmetry, and more generally, CPT symmetry) is absent. Such theories are characterised by non-zero steady-state entropy production.

At Edinburgh, Cates was the Principal Investigator of an EPSRC Programme Grant, awarded in 2011, entitled Design Principles for New Soft Materials. On his departure for Cambridge, Cait MacPhee took over as Principal Investigator. Cates remains an Honorary Professor at Edinburgh.

Early life
Cates was born on 5 May 1961. He read Natural Sciences and earned a PhD at Trinity College, Cambridge in 1985, where he studied with Sam Edwards.

Academic career
Cates was a research fellow and lecturer at the Cavendish Laboratory, University of Cambridge before moving to Edinburgh in 1995.

Honours
Cates won the Bingham Medal of the US Society of Rheology in 2016. He had previously won the 2013 Weissenberg Award of the European Society of Rheology and the
2009 Gold Medal of the British Society of Rheology. He was awarded the 2009 Dirac Prize by the Institute of Physics. He won the 1991 Maxwell Medal and Prize. He has served as an elected member of the Council of the Royal Society, and chairs the International Scientific Committee of ESPCI ParisTech. He was an honorary fellow of Trinity College, Cambridge from 2013 until 2016, when he became instead a senior research fellow.

He was also elected a member of the National Academy of Engineering in 2019 for research on the rheology, dynamics, and thermodynamics of complex fluids, and for scientific leadership in the European Community.

Works
Michael Cates has over 350 refereed scientific publications, attracting over 30 000 citations. His h-index is 105.

Highly cited publications include:

References

External links

1961 births
Living people
British physicists
Fellows of the Royal Society of Edinburgh
Fellows of the Royal Society
Academics of the University of Edinburgh
Alumni of Trinity College, Cambridge
Fellows of Trinity College, Cambridge
Maxwell Medal and Prize recipients
Lucasian Professors of Mathematics
Foreign associates of the National Academy of Sciences